Siah Baz (also Romanized as Sīah Bāz and Sīyāh Bāz; also known as Seyyed ‘Abbās) is a village in Ivughli Rural District of Ivughli District of Khoy County, West Azerbaijan province, Iran. At the 2006 National Census, its population was 2,867 in 694 households. The following census in 2011 counted 2,618 people in 666 households. The latest census in 2016 showed a population of 2,045 people in 638 households; it was the largest village in its rural district.

References 

Khoy County

Populated places in West Azerbaijan Province

Populated places in Khoy County